She was lead negotiator for president Kibaki in the National accord talks after the disputed election of 2007. She was reappointed minister of Justice & constitutional Affairs with the added mandate of National cohesion. She initiated all the necessary legislation to facilitate the coalition government, and led the enactment of the constitution of kenya review Act 2008 that enabled the completion of constitution culminating in the constitution of kenya 2010. Martha resigned on principle as minister of justice in April 2008 and continued to serve as MP Gichugu for the rest of the term.

Introduction 

Following the country's independence from the United Kingdom, the Minister of Justice of Kenya is a cabinet position created in 1963 and is responsible for the administering of justice, national cohesion and constitutional affairs. The ministerial post is now defunct, and has merged with the Department of Justice.

List of ministers

Minister of Justice and Constitutional Affairs 

Tom Mboya(1963–1965) 
Charles Njonjo (1978–1983)
Kiraitu Murungi (2003–2005)*

Minister of Justice, National Cohesion and Constitutional Affairs 

 Martha Karua (2006–2009) [1st female]
 Mutula Kilonzo (2009–2011)
Eugene Wamalwa (2011–2013) 

*The position was vacant from 1984-2002.

See also

Attorney General of Kenya
Department of Justice (Kenya)

 Justice ministry

Kenya
List of heads of state of Kenya
Heads of Government of Kenya
Vice-Presidents of Kenya
List of colonial governors of Kenya
Lists of office-holders

References

Justice

Lists of political office-holders in Kenya